Redner may refer to:

People
 Arthur Redner, an American football coach and former player
 Ethel Redner Scull, an American art collector
 Joe Redner, owner of the Mons Venus
 Joey Redner, founder of Cigar City Brewing
 Lewis Redner, an American musician
 Nicolas Redner Bodington, a French WWII officer
 Sidney Redner, a Canadian physicist

Other uses 
 Redner's Markets, an American supermarket chain

English-language surnames